Aprostoporoides is a small Indomalayan genus of hymenopteran insects of the family Eulophidae which was described in 2004 with two newly described species from Kerala.

References

Key to Nearctic eulophid genera
Universal Chalcidoidea Database

Eulophidae